Makbule Atadan (1885 – 18 January 1956) was the sister of Mustafa Kemal Atatürk, the founder of the Republic of Turkey. She was the only one surviving sister of Atatürk, while the other four siblings died at early ages.

Born 1885 in Thessaloniki, then in the Ottoman Empire, and grown up there, she moved along with her mother Zübeyde Hanım to Istanbul after the Balkan Wars.

Following the foundation of the republic in 1923, she moved with her mother to Ankara, summoned by her brother, who became the first president of Turkey. Later, she lived in the Camlı Köşk (literally Glass Pavilion), a villa built 1936 within the  garden of presidential Çankaya Palace especially for her.

In 1930, she entered the political scene joining the newly established "Serbest Cumhuriyet Fırkası" (Free Republican Party) of Fethi Okyar. However, her political life ended soon following the closure of the party by Okyar himself some months later.

Makbule married Mecdi Boysan, a member of the parliament.

She published her memories with her brother Atatürk in her book
"Büyük Kardeşim Atatürk" (Atatürk, My Big Brother) (1952).

She died on 18 January 1956 in Ankara at the age of 71, and was laid to rest in the Cebeci Asri cemetery.

References

External links
 Vatan Newspaper Photo Gallery

1885 births
1956 deaths
People from Thessaloniki
People from Salonica vilayet
Macedonian Turks
Liberal Republican Party (Turkey) politicians
20th-century Turkish politicians
Mustafa Kemal Atatürk
19th-century people from the Ottoman Empire
Burials at Cebeci Asri Cemetery